Matamuerte is a traditional Garinagu dance. It is found in the Garifuna cultures in Central America, especially Honduras and Belize. The dance is performed with a background of rhythmic drums, common among Garinagu dances. Matamuerte is a humorous dance that conveys the image of people coming across a body on a beach and poking it to see if it is dead or alive. 

Matamuerte can roughly be translated from Spanish as "death kills".

See also 
Garifuna music
Music of Honduras

External links 
The Garifuna History, Language and Culture
Seine Bight—Garinagu Dances With Drums

Dances of the Caribbean
African-American dance
Latin American folk dances